Chitinophaga agri is a Gram-negative, aerobic and long-rod-shaped bacterium from the genus of Chitinophaga.

References

Chitinophagia
Bacteria described in 2020